The 2014 PTT Pattaya Open was a women's professional tennis tournament played on outdoor hard courts. It was the 23rd edition of the PTT Pattaya Open and was part of the International category on the 2014 WTA Tour. It took place at the Dusit Thani Hotel in Pattaya, Thailand from January 27 through February 2, 2014.

Points and prize money

Point distribution

Prize money

1 Qualifiers prize money is also the Round of 32 prize money
* per team

Singles main-draw entrants

Seeds 

1 Rankings as of January 13, 2014

Other entrants 
The following players received wildcards into the main draw:
 Svetlana Kuznetsova
 Nicha Lertpitaksinchai
 Peangtarn Plipuech
 Vera Zvonareva

The following players received entry from the qualifying draw:
 Alexandra Dulgheru
 Aleksandra Krunić
 Alla Kudryavtseva
 Olga Savchuk

Withdrawals 
Before the tournament
 Misaki Doi --> replaced by Tadeja Majerič
 Varvara Lepchenko --> replaced by Anabel Medina Garrigues
 Ayumi Morita --> replaced by Estrella Cabeza Candela
 Kurumi Nara --> replaced by Yulia Putintseva
During the tournament
 Svetlana Kuznetsova (left hip injury)
 Sabine Lisicki (right shoulder injury)

Doubles main-draw entrants

Seeds 

1 Rankings are as of January 13, 2014

Other entrants 
The following pairs received wildcards into the main draw:
  Noppawan Lertcheewakarn /  Vera Zvonareva
  Varatchaya Wongteanchai /  Varunya Wongteanchai

Champions

Singles 

  Ekaterina Makarova def.  Karolína Plíšková 6–3, 7–6(9–7)

Doubles 

  Peng Shuai /  Zhang Shuai def.  Alla Kudryavtseva /  Anastasia Rodionova 3–6, 7-6(7-5), [10-6]

References

External links 
 

 
 WTA Tour
 in women's tennis
Tennis, WTA Tour, PTT Pattaya Open
Tennis, WTA Tour, PTT Pattaya Open

Tennis, WTA Tour, PTT Pattaya Open
Tennis, WTA Tour, PTT Pattaya Open